Moshe Lax is an American businessman from New York, known for his legal problems and his business association with Ivanka Trump.

Personal life and education
Lax grew up in Brooklyn as the only son of the noted diamond dealer, real estate developer, and philanthropist Chaim Lax  who partnered with Brooklyn developer Isaac Hager in gentrifying Williamsburg, Brooklyn. He attended local Hasidic schools and the religious school (yeshiva) of Rabbi Shaul Brus.

After his marriage to Shaindy Lax, he ended his religious studies (kollel) to found the Dynamic Diamonds Corp., a diamond sales business, together with his father. He resides in a mansion in Riverdale with his wife.

Business career
When his father died in 2008, Lax inherited his vast debts. Lax was sued by the estate's creditors, who alleged in court that Lax had used shell companies to hide the estate's assets, and that he attempted to extort them and other members of the Orthodox Jewish community into giving up on the debts. The lawsuit was eventually settled. Lax was also the subject of several other lawsuits, many of which regarded unpaid debts and legal fees.

In 2017, Lax opened a two-story fashion gallery on Fifth Avenue in New York. The opening was attended by Tiffany Trump, Kimberly Guilfoyle and Lax's landlord Eliot Spitzer.

In August 2018, the U.S. Department of Justice (DOJ) sued Lax for the payment of $60 million worth of taxes. The DOJ alleged that Lax, his father and his sister Zlaty Schwartz conducted complex fake transactions in order to fraudulently evade taxes.

Association with Ivanka and Donald Trump
Lax was Ivanka Trump's business partner for licensing her name in jewelry, and he helped her open an Upper East Side boutique in 2007. Lax became a friend of Ivanka Trump, her father Donald Trump and their family, and was invited to attend Donald Trump's 2016 election victory party and inauguration.

The business relationship between Lax and Ivanka Trump continued even after Lax's company defaulted on several payments in 2011, entangled Ivanka Trump in a legal dispute with another diamond dealer (which Lax lost in 2015), and continued to have other legal problems. Lax was listed as chairman of Ivanka Trump Fine Jewelry until 2017, and she at one point owned part of his company.

Academia
Moshe Lax is a Talmudic scholar of Jewish law and philosophy and has published a two-volume book titled "Derech Nesher".

Lax co-authored with Hillel E. Broder, PhD, "If I am here, then all is here: Towards a Phenomenological Existentialism in the Rabbinic Law of Beit Hillel". He also co-authored and published research on the self with neuropsychologist Stan Klein, UC Santa Barbara.

Art
Moshe published an album in collaboration with Ami Magazine titled "AMI" featuring Yaakov Lemmer.

References

Living people
Diamond dealers
Jews and Judaism in New York City
American business executives
American Orthodox Jews
Year of birth missing (living people)